The BMW X2 (model code F39) is a subcompact luxury crossover SUV produced by BMW. It was first showcased as the BMW Concept X2 at the 2016 Paris Motor Show, with a production version unveiled in October 2017. Sales commenced in March 2018. It is considered a sportier and less practical alternative to the X1, as is the case with other even-numbered X models with its respective counterparts.

Overview 
The X2 is based on the same front-wheel drive UKL2 architecture as the X1 and MINI Countryman, and features the same  wheelbase length. The X2 is assembled in Regensburg, Germany and is produced alongside the X1. Being a part of BMW X family, the vehicle is also available with xDrive all-wheel drive on higher end models. 

Both the sDrive28i and xDrive28i models are available in North American markets.

A plug-in hybrid variant, called the xDrive 25e, was unveiled in January 2020. In September 2020 BMW presented the special variant M Mesh Edition with a sporty look.

Equipment 
The X2 is offered in a standard, M Sport, and M Sport X trim. The standard trim features cloth seats, a 6.5-inch iDrive 6.0 screen, and 17-inch wheels, while M Sport and M Sport X models have 19-inch wheels and include dynamic damper control and a  lower sports suspension.

Available upgrades include Dakota leather, an upgraded 8.8-inch or 10.25-inch iDrive system with touch controls, wireless charging, a heads up display, and a Driving Assistant package that includes cruise control, lane departure warning, and speed limit information.

sDrive18i and 18d models are available with a 6-speed manual transmission, while sDrive18i models can be upgraded to a 7-speed dual-clutch transmission. The rest of the model range uses an 8-speed automatic transmission.

16-28 models with the M Sport trim and M35 models can be fitted with M Performance Parts. These include black lower bumpers, carbon fibre mirrors, a sport steering wheel and black side skirts.

Models

Petrol engines

Diesel engines

Awards 
 2017 iF Design Award for 'Mobility/Professional Concept' category
2018 EyesOn Design Awards for 'Best Vehicle Harmonization'
2018 EyesOn Design Awards for 'Best Production Vehicle'

BMW Concept X2 
The BMW Concept X2 is the concept car that preceded the introduction of the production version of the X2.

Production and sales

References

External links 
 

X2
Cars introduced in 2017
Compact sport utility vehicles
Luxury sport utility vehicles
Front-wheel-drive vehicles
All-wheel-drive vehicles
Plug-in hybrid vehicles
2020s cars